Pentanedione may refer to:

 Acetylacetone (2,4-pentanedione)
 Acetylpropionyl (2,3-pentanedione)

See also
 
 Cyclopentanedione